Dorcadion scopolii is a species of longhorn beetle in the subfamily Lamiinae.

Description
The antennae and legs are usually black. The pronotum is strongly transverse. The shoulder is external, spinal and seems to have almost an equal width of stripes.

References

External links
Dorcadion scopolii on YouTube

scopolii
Beetles described in 1784